In November 1755, Pasquale Paoli proclaimed Corsica a sovereign nation, the Corsican Republic, independent from the Republic of Genoa. He created the Corsican Constitution, which was the first constitution written in Italian under Enlightenment principles, including female suffrage, later revoked by the French when they took over the island in 1769. The republic created an administration and justice system, and founded an army.

Foundation
After a series of successful actions, Paoli drove the Genoese from the whole island except for a few coastal towns. He then set to work re-organizing the government, introducing many reforms. He founded a university at Corte and created a short-lived "Order of Saint-Devote" in 1757 in honour of the patron saint of the island, Saint Devota.

The Corsican Diet was composed of delegates elected from each district for three-year terms.  Suffrage was extended to all men over the age of 25. Traditionally, women had always voted in village elections for podestà i.e. village elders, and other local officials, and it has been claimed that they also voted in national elections under the Republic.

The Republic minted its own coins at Murato in 1761, imprinted with the Moor's Head, the traditional symbol of Corsica.

Paoli's ideas of independence, democracy and liberty gained support from such philosophers as Jean-Jacques Rousseau, Voltaire, Raynal, and Mably. The publication in 1768 of An Account of Corsica by James Boswell made Paoli famous throughout Europe. Diplomatic recognition was extended to Corsica by the Bey of Tunis.

French invasion

In 1767, Corsica took the island of Capraia from the Genoese who, one year later, despairing of ever being able to subjugate Corsica again, sold their claim to the Kingdom of France with the Treaty of Versailles.

The French invaded Corsica the same year, and for a whole year Paoli's forces fought desperately for their new republic against the invaders. However, in May 1769, at the Battle of Ponte Novu they were defeated by vastly superior forces commanded by the Comte de Vaux, and obliged to take refuge in the Kingdom of Great Britain. French control was consolidated over the island, and in 1770 it became a province of France.

Aftermath

The fall of Corsica to the French was poorly received by many in Great Britain, which was Corsica's main ally and sponsor. It was seen as a failure of the Grafton Ministry that Corsica had been "lost", as it was regarded as vital to the interests of Britain in that part of the Mediterranean. The Corsican Crisis severely weakened the Grafton Ministry, contributing to its ultimate downfall. A number of exiled Corsicans fought for the British during the American Revolutionary War, serving with particular distinction during the Great Siege of Gibraltar in 1782.

Conversely, at the beginning of the same war, the New York militia later named Hearts of Oak - whose membership included Alexander Hamilton and other students at New York's King's College (now Columbia University) - originally called themselves "The Corsicans", evidently considering the Corsican Republic as a model to be emulated in America.

The aspiration for Corsican independence, along with many of the democratic principles of the Corsican Republic, were revived by Paoli in the Anglo-Corsican Kingdom of 1794–1796. On that occasion, British naval and land forces were deployed in defence of the island; however, their efforts failed and the French regained control.

To this day, some Corsican separatists such as the (now-disbanded) Armata Corsa, advocate the restoration of the island's republic.

See also 
Account of Corsica
Corsican Constitution
Corsican Crisis
Pasquale Paoli
History of Corsica

References

External links 
 First Corsican constitution (1755), in French

States and territories established in 1755
1755 establishments in Europe
1769 disestablishments in Europe
Republic
Island countries
Former republics
Former unrecognized countries
Italian states
Former countries